Marco Rudolph (born 22 May 1970 in Zittau, Saxony) is a retired German boxer, who won the Lightweight Silver medal at the 1992 Summer Olympics.

Professional career 
Rudolph began his professional career in 1995 and had limited success.  He fought Artur Grigorian in 1998 for the WBO Lightweight Title, but was TKO'd in the 6th.  Rudolph retired after the fight with a record of 13-1-0.

Amateur career 
Record: 207-28-1
1987 German National Featherweight Champion
1988 European Junior Featherweight Champion
1989 German National Featherweight Champion
1989 2nd place at Featherweight at the 1989 European Amateur Boxing Championships, losing to Kirkor Kirkorov of Bulgaria in final.
1991 3rd place at 1991 European Amateur Boxing Championships, losing to Vasile Nistor of Romania by 1st-round TKO.
1991 German National Lightweight Champion
1991 World Amateur Lightweight Champion in Sydney, Australia.
Oscar De La Hoya (United States) won on points
Julien Lorcy (France) won on points
Vasile Nistor (Romania) won on points
Artur Grigorian (Unified Team) won on points
1992 German National Lightweight Champion
Silver medalist at Lightweight the 1992 Barcelona Olympic Games.
Vasile Nistor (Romania) won on points
Dariusz Snarski (Poland) won on points
Julien Lorcy (France) won on points
Namjilyn Bayarsaikhan (Mongolia) won on points
Oscar De La Hoya (United States) lost on points
1993 World Amateur Boxing Championships in Tampere, Finland, competed at Lightweight. Lost in 2nd round Damian Austin of Cuba.
1993 2nd place in German Amateur Championships as a Lightweight, losing to Heiko Hinz in the final.
1994 Lightweight Gold Medalist at World Cup competition in Bangkok, Thailand.
Mekhak Kazarian (Armenia) won on points
Godwin Osagie (Nigeria) won on points
Nurlan Kalibaev (Kazakhstan) won on points
Bruno Wartelle (France) won on points
Julio Gonzalez (Cuba) won on points
1994 German Amateur Lightweight champion, defeating Heiko Hinz in the final.
1995 3rd place at Lightweight in 1995 World Amateur Boxing Championships held in Berlin, Germany.
Diego Corrales (United States) won on points
Alex Trujillo (Puerto Rico) won on points
Paata Gvasalia (Russia) won on points
Leonard Doroftei (Romania) won on points

External links
 

1970 births
Living people
People from Zittau
Lightweight boxers
Boxers at the 1992 Summer Olympics
Olympic boxers of Germany
Olympic silver medalists for Germany
Olympic medalists in boxing
Medalists at the 1992 Summer Olympics
German male boxers
AIBA World Boxing Championships medalists
Sportspeople from Saxony